Fendi is an Italian luxury fashion house producing fur, ready-to-wear, leather goods, shoes, fragrances, eyewear, timepieces and accessories. Founded in Rome in 1925, Fendi is known for its fur, fur accessories, and leather goods.
Since 2001, Fendi has been part of the “Fashion & Leather Goods” division of French group LVMH. Its headquarters are in Rome, in the Palazzo della Civiltà Italiana.

History

Early years
The house of Fendi was launched in 1925 by Adele and Edoardo Fendi (1904-1954) as a fur and leather shop in Via del Plebiscito, Rome. In 1932 Adele and Edoardo Fendi opened a boutique in via Piave; the shop became a popular destination for tourists in Rome.

From 1946, the five sisters Paola, Anna, Franca, Carla, and Alda joined the company in its second generation as a family-owned enterprise,  each owning 20 percent. Karl Lagerfeld joined Fendi in 1965 and became the creative director for the fur and women's ready-to-wear collections (launched in 1977).

In 1966, Lagerfeld created the company logo, a double F in a square, which would later be the subject of various reinterpretations. Also in 1966, Fendi presented its first high fashion collection, expanding its interests in the United States and Japan. In 1969, its first commercial line of fur was launched, and in the following years, cosmetics and men accessories were released. In 1977, Fendi introduced clothing for the first time, its ready-to-wear collection.

1980s–1990s
In the 1980s, Fendi expanded its range with perfumes in 1985, as well as eyewear, jeans, and home furnishings in 1987.

In 1989, Fendi opened its first United States boutique in New York on 5th Avenue.

In 1994, Paola Fendi handed over presidency of the company to her younger sister Carla. Silvia Venturini Fendi, daughter of Anna, joined the fashion house in 1994 and has since been the artistic director for accessories and co-designer of the women's line alongside Lagerfeld; in 1997 she designed the Baguette Bag, an iconic model that beat all sales and notoriety records.

Sale of controlling share 
Fendi was a family-controlled company until 1999, when Prada and LVMH, the world's biggest luxury goods group, joined to buy 51 percent of Fendi for $545 million; competitor Gucci lost out in the bidding process. Under the deal, Prada and LVMH were obligated to acquire any of the 49 percent of Fendi, should the sisters decide to sell. The label lost approximately 20 million euros in 2001 and again in 2002. In 2002, Prada agreed to sell its 25.5 percent stake to LVMH for $265 million. In 2002, LVMH acquired an additional 15.9 percent of the company. Carla Fendi, a member of the founding family, continued to act as chairwoman and a minority owner until 2008.

On 19 October 2007, Fendi chose the Great Wall of China to present its spring-summer collection and with 88 models, the first fashion show there.

In 2009, Silvia Venturini Fendi created the Peekaboo bag, achieving a success comparable to the Baguette Bag.

2010s
In 2014, Fendi started making plans to use drones to show its catwalk fashions. 

In 2015, Fendi celebrated fifty years of business with Karl Lagerfeld and organized its first haute couture fashion show dedicated to furs, Haute Fourrure, at the Théâtre des Champs-Élysées in Paris. Later the brand celebrated its 90th anniversary with a fashion show at the Trevi fountain in Rome and planned to move its headquarters to Palazzo della Civiltà Italiana, paying 2.8 million euros per annum to occupy the space; Fendi instead opened a hotel and its largest store at the location in 2016. 
 
In 2017, Fendi released a customization shop in collaboration with e-commerce platform Farfetch for made-to-order handbag designs.

Recent developments
By 2018, Fendi crossed the 1 billion euro ($1.2 billion) threshold in annual sales and had 3,000 employees worldwide, including around 400 in specialist leather and fur ateliers in Italy, and operated a network of 215 stores.

In September 2020, English designer Kim Jones was announced as artistic director of Fendi's women's collection, formerly occupied by Lagerfeld. Under his leadership, Fendi collaborated with Kim Kardashian West's shapewear brand Skims on a clothing collection.

Other activities

Fendi Kids
In 2010, the Fendi Kids label made its debut in Spring/Summer 2011.

Fragrances
In 2010, Fendi launched a new fragrance – Fan di Fendi – before discontinuing its fragrances in 2015.

Eyewear
From 2013 until 2021, the company had a brand licensing agreement with Safilo for the design, production and worldwide distribution of Fendi sunglasses and optical frames.

In 2021, Fendi ended its partnership with Safilo and entered into an agreement with LVMH-owned Thelios to create, produce, and distribute its eyewear collection.

Fendi Casa
Fendi started its first line of home furnishings in 1987. Fendi Casa terminated its collaboration with licensee Luxury Living and instead partnered with Design Holding, jointly controlled by Investindustrial and The Carlyle Group, on creating Fashion Furniture Design (FF Design) to produce and distribute Fendi Casa.

Real estate
In 2016, Fendi collaborated with the interior designer Fanny Haim on the Fendi Château Residences, a 12-story beachfront condo in Surfside designed by the architecture firm Arquitectonica.

Artistic directors 
After 2019 Karl Lagerfeld direction (1965-2019), Silvia Venturini Fendi took over both the men's and women's collections. From September 2020, the women's collection was entrusted to Kim Jones, former stylist for the Dior men's collection, who was appointed artistic director of couture and womenswear. Silvia Venturini remains artistic director of accessories and menswear. Jones' debut collection was for Fall / Winter 2021/2022. In 2021 Delfina Delettrez Fendi, Silvia Venturini Fendi’s daughter, was appointed artistic director of jewelry.

Cinema 
Fendi has often collaborated with cinema; the maison has designed the clothes for Once Upon a Time in America, Evita and The Royal Tenenbaums.
Many famous film directors in the 1970s, including Luchino Visconti, Federico Fellini, Franco Zeffirelli, and Mauro Bolognini, chose Fendi furs for their characters. Fendi has also dressed Sophia Loren, Diana Ross, Jacqueline Kennedy Onassis, Soraya, and Liza Minnelli.

Campaigns 
Lagerfeld himself was responsible for the photography of Fendi's ad campaigns before his death; since then, Fendi has used Nick Knight, Craig McDean and Steven Meisel.

Philanthropy 
In 2013, Fendi pledged more than 2 million euros to sponsor projects, including a clean-up of the Quattro Fontane and the restoration of the Trevi Fountain in Rome, and held the company's 90th anniversary show over the fountain using a plexiglas floor. In 2018, Fendi signed a partnership with the Galleria Borghese to support the museum's exhibitions for the following three years. 

In 2019, Fendi committed 2.5 million euros to restore the Temple of Venus and Roma, when it held its couture show at the site. By 2021, Fendi completed the temple’s restoration. 

Also in 2021, Fendi collaborated with a non-profit organization to create a 'charity project' which consisted of designing a kids' unisex T-shirt whose money would be devoted to realize the wishes of kids who suffer from serious sicknesses.

Controversy 
Fendi sued Burlington in 1986 for selling counterfeit handbags, and filed a new lawsuit in 2006 after concluding the company was violating the injunction. In 2010, a U.S. Magistrate recommended that Burlington pay Fendi just over $5.6 million in damages, attorney's fees and costs to settle a dispute dating to 1986 over the alleged sale of counterfeit Fendi-branded leather goods. Burlington subsequently agreed to pay $10.05 million.

Also in 2010, Fendi reached a $2.5 million settlement with the former parent company of Filene's Basement to resolve counterfeiting claims.

References

External links

Fendi
Italian suit makers
LVMH brands
Fashion accessory brands
Haute couture
Luxury brands
High fashion brands
Clothing brands of Italy
Clothing retailers of Italy
Italian companies established in 1925
Eyewear brands of Italy
Jewellery retailers of Italy
Bags (fashion)
Perfume houses
Watch brands
Shoe companies of Italy
Watch manufacturing companies of Italy
Clothing companies established in 1925
Design companies established in 1925